In philosophy, political science and sociology, elite theory is a theory of the State that seeks to describe and explain power relationships in contemporary society. The theory posits that a small minority, consisting of members of the economic elite and policy-planning networks, holds the most power—and that this power is independent of democratic elections.

Through positions in corporations or on corporate boards, and influence over policy-planning networks through the financial support of foundations or positions with think tanks or policy-discussion groups, members of the "elite" exert significant power over corporate and government decisions.

The basic characteristics of this theory are that power is concentrated, the elites are unified, the non-elites are diverse and powerless, elites' interests are unified due to common backgrounds and positions and the defining characteristic of power is institutional position.

Elite theory opposes pluralism (more than one system of power), a tradition that emphasized how multiple major social groups and interests have an influence upon and various forms of representation within more powerful sets of rulers, contributing to decently representative political outcomes that reflect the collective needs of society.

Even when entire groups are ostensibly completely excluded from the state's traditional networks of power (on the basis of arbitrary criteria such as nobility, race, gender, or religion), elite theory recognizes that "counter-elites" frequently develop within such excluded groups. Negotiations between such disenfranchised groups and the state can be analyzed as negotiations between elites and counter-elites. A major problem, in turn, is the ability of elites to co-opt counter-elites.

Democratic systems function on the premise that voting behavior has a direct, noticeable effect on policy outcomes, and that these outcomes are preferred by the largest portion of voters. Strikingly, a study published in 2014, which correlated voters' preferences to policy outcomes, found that the statistical correlation between the two is heavily dependent on the income brackets of the voting groups. At the lowest income sampled in the data, the correlation coefficient reached zero, whereas the highest income returned a correlation coefficient above 0.6. The conclusion of this research was that there is a strong, linear correlation between the income of voters and how often their policy preferences become reality. The causation for this correlation has not yet been proven in subsequent studies, but is an active area of research.

History

Ancient Perspective on Elite Theory
Polybius (~150 B.C.) referred to what we call today Elite Theory as simply "autocracy". He posited with great confidence that all 3 originating forms of sources of political power: one man (monarchy/executive), few men (autocracy), many (democracy) would eventually be corrupted into a debased form of itself, if not balanced in a "mixed government". Monarchy would become "tyranny", democracy would become "mob rule", and rule by elites (autocracy) would become corrupted in what he called "oligarchy". Polybius effectively said this is due to a failure to properly apply checks and balances between the three mentioned forms as well as subsequent political institutions.

Italian school of elitism
Vilfredo Pareto (1848–1923), Gaetano Mosca (1858–1941), and Robert Michels (1876–1936), were cofounders of the Italian school of elitism, which influenced subsequent elite theory in the Western tradition.

The outlook of the Italian school of elitism is based on two ideas:
 Power lies in position of authority in key economic and political institutions.
 The psychological difference that sets elites apart is that they have personal resources, for instance intelligence and skills, and a vested interest in the government; while the rest are incompetent and do not have the capabilities of governing themselves, the elite are resourceful and strive to make the government work. For in reality, the elite would have the most to lose in a failed state.

Vilfredo Pareto
Pareto emphasized the psychological and intellectual superiority of elites, believing that they were the highest accomplishers in any field. He discussed the existence of two types of elites:
 Governing elites
 Non-governing elites
He also extended the idea that a whole elite can be replaced by a new one and how one can circulate from being elite to non-elite.

Gaetano Mosca
Mosca emphasized the sociological and personal characteristics of elites. He said elites are an organized minority and that the masses are an unorganized majority. The ruling class is composed of the ruling elite and the sub-elites. He divides the world into two group:

 Political class
 Non-Political class

Mosca asserts that elites have intellectual, moral, and material superiority that is highly esteemed and influential.

Robert Michels
Sociologist Michels developed the iron law of oligarchy where, he asserts, social and political organizations are run by few individuals, and social organization and labor division are key. He believed that all organizations were elitist and that elites have three basic principles that help in the bureaucratic structure of political organization: 
 Need for leaders, specialized staff and facilities
 Utilization of facilities by leaders within their organization
 The importance of the psychological attributes of the leaders

Contemporary elite theorists

Elmer Eric Schattschneider
Elmer Eric Schattschneider offered a strong critique of the American political theory of pluralism: Rather than an essentially democratic system in which the many competing interests of citizens are amply represented, if not advanced, by equally many competing interest groups, Schattschneider argued the pressure system is biased in favor of "the most educated and highest-income members of society", and showed that "the difference between those who participate in interest group activity and those who stand at the sidelines is much greater than between voters and nonvoters".

In The Semisovereign People, Schattschneider argued the scope of the pressure system is really quite small: The "range of organized, identifiable, known groups is amazingly narrow; there is nothing remotely universal about it" and the "business or upper-class bias of the pressure system shows up everywhere". He says the "notion that the pressure system is automatically representative of the whole community is a myth" and, instead, the "system is skewed, loaded and unbalanced in favor of a fraction of a minority".

C. Wright Mills

Mills published his book The Power Elite in 1956, in which he claimed to present a new sociological perspective on systems of power in the United States. He identified a triumvirate of power groups—political, economic and military—which form a distinguishable, although not unified, power-wielding body in the United States.

Mills proposed that this group had been generated through a process of rationalization at work in all advanced industrial societies whereby the mechanisms of power became concentrated, funneling overall control into the hands of a limited, somewhat corrupt group. This reflected a decline in politics as an arena for debate and relegation to a merely formal level of discourse. This macro-scale analysis sought to point out the degradation of democracy in "advanced" societies and the fact that power generally lies outside the boundaries of elected representatives.

A main influence for the study was Franz Leopold Neumann's book, Behemoth: The Structure and Practice of National Socialism, 1933–1944, a study of how Nazism came to power in the German democratic state. It provided the tools to analyze the structure of a political system and served as a warning of what could happen in a modern capitalistic democracy.

Floyd Hunter
The elite theory analysis of power was also applied on the micro scale in community power studies such as that by Floyd Hunter (1953). Hunter examined in detail the power of relationships evident in his "Regional City" looking for the "real" holders of power rather than those in obvious official positions. He posited a structural-functional approach that mapped hierarchies and webs of interconnection within the city—mapping relationships of power between businessmen, politicians, clergy etc. The study was promoted to debunk current concepts of any "democracy" present within urban politics and reaffirm the arguments for a true representative democracy. This type of analysis was also used in later, larger scale, studies such as that carried out by M. Schwartz examining the power structures within the sphere of the corporate elite in the United States.

G. William Domhoff
In his controversial 1967 book Who Rules America?, G. William Domhoff researched local and national decision-making process networks seeking to illustrate the power structure in the United States. He asserts, much like Hunter, that an elite class that owns and manages large income-producing properties (like banks and corporations) dominate the American power structure politically and economically.

James Burnham
Burnham's early work The Managerial Revolution sought to express the movement of all functional power into the hands of managers rather than politicians or businessmen—separating ownership and control.

Robert D. Putnam
Putnam saw the development of technical and exclusive knowledge among administrators and other specialist groups as a mechanism that strips power from the democratic process and slips it to the advisors and specialists who influence the decision process.
"If the dominant figures of the past hundred years have been the entrepreneur, the businessman, and the industrial executive, the ‘new men’ are the scientists, the mathematicians, the economists, and the engineers of the new intellectual technology."

Thomas R. Dye
Dye in his book Top Down Policymaking, argues that U.S. public policy does not result from the "demands of the people", but rather from elite consensus found in Washington, D.C.-based non-profit foundations, think tanks, special-interest groups, and prominent lobbying and law firms. Dye's thesis is further expanded upon in his works: The Irony of Democracy, Politics in America, Understanding Public Policy, and Who's Running America?.

George A. Gonzalez
In his book Corporate Power and the Environment, George A. Gonzalez writes on the power of U.S. economic elites to shape environmental policy for their own advantage. In The Politics of Air Pollution: Urban Growth, Ecological Modernization and Symbolic Inclusion and also in Urban Sprawl, Global Warming, and the Empire of Capital Gonzalez employs elite theory to explain the interrelationship between environmental policy and urban sprawl in America. His most recent work, Energy and Empire: The Politics of Nuclear and Solar Power in the United States demonstrates that economic elites tied their advocacy of the nuclear energy option to post-1945 American foreign policy goals, while at the same time these elites opposed government support for other forms of energy, such as solar, that cannot be dominated by one nation.

Ralf Dahrendorf
In his book Reflections on the Revolution in Europe, Ralf Dahrendorf asserts that, due to advanced level of competence required for political activity, a political party tends to become, actually, a provider of "political services", that is, the administration of local and governmental public offices. During the electoral campaign, each party tries to convince voters it is the most suitable for managing the state business. The logical consequence would be to acknowledge this character and openly register the parties as service providing companies. In this way, the ruling class would include the members and associates of legally acknowledged companies and the "class that is ruled" would select by election the state administration company that best fits its interests.

Martin Gilens and Benjamin I. Page
In their statistical analysis of 1,779 policy issues professors Martin Gilens and Benjamin Page found that "economic elites and organized groups representing business interests have substantial independent impacts on U.S. government policy, while average citizens and mass-based interest groups have little or no independent influence." Critics cited by Vox.com argued, using the same dataset, that when the rich and middle class disagreed, the rich got their preferred outcome 53 percent of the time and the middle class got what they wanted 47 percent of the time. Some critics disagree with Gilens and Pages' headline conclusion, but do believe that the dataset confirms "the rich and middle (class) are effective at blocking policies that the poor want".

Thomas Ferguson
The political scientist Thomas Ferguson's Investment Theory of Party Competition can be thought of as an elite theory. Set out most extensively in his 1995 book Golden Rule: The Investment Theory of Party Competition and the Logic of Money-driven Political Systems, the theory begins by noting that in modern political systems the cost of acquiring political awareness is so great that no citizen can afford it. As a consequence, these systems tend be dominated by those who can, most typically elites and corporations. These elites then seek to influence politics by 'investing' in the parties or policies they support through political contributions and other means such as endorsements in the media.

See also
 Democratic deficit
 Elitism
 Iron law of oligarchy
 Mass society
 Positive political theory
 The Power Elite
 Ruling class
 Expressions of dominance
 Liberal elite
 Invisible Class Empire

References

Bibliography
 Amsden, Alice (2012) The Role of Elites in Economic Development, Oxford University Press, 2012. with Alisa Di Caprio and James A. Robinson.
 Bottomore, T. (1993) Elites and Society (2nd Edition). London: Routledge.
 Burnham, J. (1960) The Managerial Revolution. Bloomington: Indiana University Press.
 Crockett, Norman L. ed. The power elite in America (1970), excerpts from experts online free
 Domhoff. G. William (1967–2009) Who Rules America? McGraw-Hill. online 5th edition
 Domhoff, G. William. Studying the power elite: Fifty years of who rules America? (Routledge, 2017); new essays by 12 experts 
 Downey, Liam, et al. "Power, hegemony, and world society theory: A critical evaluation." Socius 6 (2020): 2378023120920059 online.
 Dye, T. R. (2000) Top Down Policymaking New York: Chatham House Publishers.
 Gonzalez, G. A. (2012) Energy and Empire: The Politics of Nuclear and Solar Power in the United States. Albany: State University of New York Press 
 Gonzalez, G. A. (2009) Urban Sprawl, Global Warming, and the Empire of Capital. Albany: State University of New York Press 
 Gonzalez, G. A. (2006) The Politics of Air Pollution: Urban Growth, Ecological Modernization, And Symbolic Inclusion. Albany: State University of New York Press 
 Gonzalez, G. A. (2001) Corporate Power and the Environment. Rowman & Littlefield Publishers
 Hunter, Floyd (1953) Community Power Structure: A Study of Decision Makers.
 Lerner, R., A. K. Nagai, S. Rothman (1996) American Elites. New Haven CT: Yale University Press
 Milch, Jan, (1992) . C.Wright Mills och hans sociologiska vision Om hans syn på makt och metod och vetenskap,. Sociologiska Institution Göteborgs Universit-("C.Wright Mills and his sociological vision About his views on power and methodology and science. Department of Sociology Gothenburg University")
 Mills, C. Wright  (1956) The Power Elite. online
 Neumann, Franz Leopold (1944). Behemoth: The Structure and Practice of National Socialism, 1933 - 1944. Harper. online
 Putnam, R. D. (1976) The Comparative Study of Political Elites. New Jersey: Prentice Hall.
 Putnam, R. D. (1977) ‘Elite Transformation in Advance Industrial Societies: An Empirical Assessment of the Theory of Technocracy’ in Comparative Political Studies Vol. 10, No. 3, pp383–411.
 Schwartz, M. (ed.) (1987) The Structure of Power in America: The Corporate Elite as a Ruling Class. New York: Holmes & Meier.
 Volpe, G. (2021) Italian Elitism and the Reshaping of Democracy in the United States. Abingdon, Oxon; New York: Routledge.

Comparative politics
 
Political science theories
Sociological theories
Social class in the United States
Political science
Conflict theory
Structural functionalism
Majority–minority relations